Lac-Chicobi is an unorganized territory in the Canadian province of Quebec, located within the Abitibi Regional County Municipality. The area consists of two non-contiguous portions on either side of the incorporated municipality of Berry.

The eponymous Lake Chicobi is roughly in the centre of the territory's western portion. It is fed by the Authier and Chicobi Rivers and drained by the Octave River, a tributary of the Harricana River. The lake's name, in the past also spelled as Chikobi, Chikobee, and Cikobi, comes from a First Nations word meaning "where there are no islands".

South of Lake Chicobi is the community of Guyenne, the territory's only population centre. It is named after the geographic township of Guyenne (proclaimed in 1916), in turn named for the Régiment de Guyenne that fought under General Montcalm's command.

Demographics
Population:
 Population in 2021: 161 (2016 to 2021 population change: 18.4%)
 Population in 2016: 136 
 Population in 2011: 203 
 Population in 2006: 176
 Population in 2001: 191
 Population in 1996: 227
 Population in 1991: 235

Private dwellings occupied by usual residents: 71 (total dwellings: 81)

References

Unorganized territories in Abitibi-Témiscamingue